Patrick Murray (11 March 1945 – 3 July 2021) was an Australian sports shooter. He competed at the 1992 Summer Olympics and the 1996 Summer Olympics.

References

External links
 

1945 births
2021 deaths
Australian male sport shooters
Commonwealth Games medallists in shooting
Commonwealth Games gold medallists for Australia
Commonwealth Games silver medallists for Australia
Commonwealth Games bronze medallists for Australia
Olympic shooters of Australia
Shooters at the 1986 Commonwealth Games
Shooters at the 1990 Commonwealth Games
Shooters at the 1994 Commonwealth Games
Shooters at the 1998 Commonwealth Games
Shooters at the 1992 Summer Olympics
Shooters at the 1996 Summer Olympics
Sportspeople from London
20th-century Australian people
Medallists at the 1986 Commonwealth Games
Medallists at the 1990 Commonwealth Games
Medallists at the 1994 Commonwealth Games
Medallists at the 1998 Commonwealth Games